Jason-Collin Fraser (born 15 April 1991 in Amanzimtoti, South Africa) is a South African rugby union player, currently playing with Nevers in the French Pro D2. His regular position is flanker or number eight.

Career

Varsity Rugby

Fraser was a member of the  since it joined the newly formed second tier of the Varsity Rugby competition, the Varsity Shield, in 2011.

In the 2012 Varsity Shield competition, Fraser made eight starts and scored a try against  as the side finished in second place, but reversed the result of the previous season, beating  19–17 to win the Varsity Shield competition and win promotion to the 2013 Varsity Cup. Fraser also linked up with the  side, making one appearance for them in their 2012 Under-21 Provincial Championship match against .

Despite a tough season in the 2013 Varsity Cup competition that saw Wits lose all seven of their matches, he made six appearances and scored two tries in their final match against  to help secure Wits a four-try bonus point, the only points they picked up during the campaign. Their fortunes only marginally improved in the 2014 Varsity Cup, again finishing bottom and picking up just two losing bonus points.

Boland Cavaliers

Fraser's performances didn't go unnoticed, however, and he signed for Wellington-based side  before their 2014 Currie Cup qualification campaign. He made his first class debut for Boland in their match against  in Welkom in a 25–27 loss. Boland eventually finished fifth in the qualification competition and therefore consigned to a season in the Currie Cup First Division, with Fraser making a further five appearances in that competition as Boland finished fifth to miss out on a semi-final spot.

Pumas

In 2015, he joined Nelspruit-based outfit  prior to the 2015 Vodacom Cup. He was a member of the Pumas side that won the Vodacom Cup for the first time in 2015, beating  24–7 in the final. Fraser made eight appearances during the season, scoring two tries.

Griquas

He signed a contract to join Kimberley-based side  prior to the 2016 season.

References

1991 births
Living people
Boland Cavaliers players
People from Amanzimtoti
Pumas (Currie Cup) players
Rugby union flankers
Rugby union number eights
South African rugby union players
USON Nevers players
Rugby union players from KwaZulu-Natal